Balta Verde may refer to several villages in Romania:

 Balta Verde, a village in Podari Commune, Dolj County
 Balta Verde, a village in the commune of Gogoșu, Mehedinți

See also
 Balta (disambiguation)